The Timmerman–Burd Building is a historic building located in Mount Pleasant, Iowa, United States.  The previous building on this lot was destroyed in a fire in 1883 and Henry Timmerman had this building constructed to replace it the same year.  The two story brick structure is one of several building facing the town square in the Italianate style.  This building features a single storefront, and four segmental arch windows on the second floor with simple brick patterned hood molds.  The bracketed metal cornice at the top of the main facade was mass-produced and likely ordered from a catalog.  Burd worked for Timmerman and took over the business.  This building housed a shoe store as late as the 1990s.  It was listed on the National Register of Historic Places in 1991.

References

Commercial buildings completed in 1883
Buildings and structures in Mount Pleasant, Iowa
National Register of Historic Places in Henry County, Iowa
Commercial buildings on the National Register of Historic Places in Iowa
Italianate architecture in Iowa